A referendum on restoring the monarchy was held in Greece on 3 November 1935. The proposal was approved by nearly 97.9% of voters, although the conduct during the referendum is not considered to have been free or fair. George II returned from exile and was restored to the throne on 25 November 1935.

Background
After the defeat of Greece by the Turkish National Movement (the "Asia Minor Disaster" of 1922), the defeated army revolted against the royal government. King Constantine I was forced to abdicate in 1922, and died in exile in 1923. His eldest son and successor, King George II, was soon after asked by the parliament to leave Greece so the nation could decide what form of government it should adopt. In a 1924 referendum, Greeks voted to create a republic.

In 1935, Prime Minister Georgios Kondylis, a former pro-Venizelos military officer, became the most powerful political figure in Greece. On 10 October, he compelled Panagis Tsaldaris to resign as Prime Minister and took over the government, suspending many constitutional provisions in the process. Kondylis, who had now joined the Conservatives, decided to hold a referendum in order to re-establish the monarchy, despite the fact that he used to be a supporter of the anti-monarchist wing of Greek politics.

The referendum was scheduled to take place on 3 November per resolution "on the abolition of the republic" of 10 October 1935 (ΦΕΚ Α΄ 456).

Conduct
Observers of the time expressed serious doubts about the vote's legitimacy. Besides the implausibly high "yes" vote, the vote was held in far-from-secret circumstances. Voters dropped a blue piece of paper into the ballot box if they supported the king's return, or a red paper to retain the republic.  Anyone who cast a red paper risked being beaten up.

Results

References

Plebiscite
1930s in Greek politics
Referendums in Greece
Greece
Republicanism in Greece
History of Greece (1924–1941)
Monarchism in Greece
Monarchy referendums
Greece